Russell Freeman may refer to:

Russell Freeman (American football) (born 1969)
Russ Freeman (pianist) (1926–2002), jazz pianist
Russell F. Freeman (born 1939), former U.S. Ambassador to Belize
Russ Freeman (guitarist) (born 1960), jazz fusion guitarist, composer, bandleader of The Rippingtons and Peak Records founder

See also
Russell Freedman (1929–2018), author